Fairdale High School is a high school located in the Fairdale area of Louisville, Kentucky, United States. It is part of the Jefferson County Public Schools. As of the 2013–14 school year, there were 1,804 students at the school.

 Areas of study include Law Enforcement, Fire and Emergency Medical Technology, Medical Office Technology, Radio Electronic Communications, and Heavy Equipment Science/Construction. Students shadow professionals in each field and have the opportunity to work in an internship position at various facilities throughout the Louisville area.

Academics
Fairdale was named a Best High School by U.S. News at the Bronze level in 2013. Fairdale maintains a varsity and junior varsity Quick Recall team.

Athletics
Sports offered at Fairdale include football, baseball, basketball, golf, wrestling, tennis, track and field, cross country, swimming, bowling, and most recently, soccer for boys, and volleyball, softball, basketball, golf, tennis, track and field, cross country, bowling, and cheerleading for girls. There is also a dance team for either sex. Archery is also available.

Fairdale hosts the King of the Bluegrass Basketball and Wrestling Tournament annually. The King of the Bluegrass All-Team Tennis Championships were held from 2008 through 2010, and it is now known as the Decoturf High School Tennis Team Championships.  New in 2020, Fairdale hosts King/Queen of the Hill Cross Country course  at Horine Park.

Fairdale was Kentucky State Champion in men's basketball in 1990, 1991, and 1994.

See also
 Public schools in Louisville, Kentucky

References

External links
 

Jefferson County Public Schools (Kentucky)
Public high schools in Kentucky
Educational institutions established in 1958
1958 establishments in Kentucky
High schools in Louisville, Kentucky